The Elected Authorities (Northern Ireland) Act 1989 is an Act of the Parliament of the United Kingdom. It brought in a law that required candidates standing for election in Northern Irish local and Northern Ireland Assembly elections to declare they would not, by word or deed, express support for or approval of proscribed organisations or acts of terrorism (that is to say, violence for political ends).

It had the effect of disqualifying numerous candidates in the 1989 Northern Ireland local government elections, particularly 23 candidates of the Republican Sinn Féin (RSF).

Background 
In Northern Ireland, elections to local government had historically been dominated by the unionist majority due to Catholic nationalist disincentive to take part in elections. In 1974, in order to encourage more Catholic participation the political wing of the Irish Republican Army, Sinn Féin; which had been designated as a proscribed terrorist organisation by the Parliament of Northern Ireland in 1956, was removed from the list of proscribed organisations. They then started to gain seats in local government.

In 1983, following the IRA Harrods bombing, the British government considered making Sinn Féin a proscribed organisation again alongside the Ulster Defence Association unionist paramilitary group. This proposal had support from the Democratic Unionist Party who claimed Sinn Féin were a front for terrorism and one newspaper called them "...the IRA in drag". A report by Sir George Baker argued against proscription of both groups however, he did make comments suggesting legislation against those using terrorism during elections.

Act 
Baker's report was used as grounds for the creation of the Elected Authorities (Northern Ireland) Act 1989. The act required that in order for any candidate to stand for election in Northern Ireland, they were required to make a declaration against terrorism. The full declaration is: "I declare that, if elected, I will not by word or deed express support for or approval of (a) any organisation that is for the time being a proscribed organisation specified in Schedule 2 of the Northern Ireland (Emergency Provisions) Act 1978: or (b) acts of terrorism (that is to say violence for political ends) connected with the affairs of Northern Ireland". The act also disqualified anyone who had been imprisoned for longer than three months from standing for elected office in Northern Ireland for five years.

Results 
Though the act was primarily aimed at Sinn Féin in lieu of outright proscription, Sinn Féin candidates agreed to sign the declaration. Republican Sinn Féin however called it a "test oath" and refused to sign it. As a result, their candidates were banned from taking part in the 1989 Northern Ireland local elections. They also attempted to run candidates in the 2011 Northern Ireland local elections but their nominations were rejected because they again refused to sign the declaration as required by the Act.

References

The Troubles (Northern Ireland)
United Kingdom Acts of Parliament 1989
Emergency laws in the United Kingdom
Acts of the Parliament of the United Kingdom concerning Northern Ireland
1989 in Northern Ireland